Ioannis Zacharias (1845 – ) was a Greek painter.

Life

Ioannis Zacharias was born in Athens in 1845. 
He entered the Athens School of Fine Arts in 1859, and graduated in 1866.
In 1867 he went on to the Academy of Fine Arts, Munich, to study under Karl von Piloty.
His teacher recommended awarding him a scholarship due to his ability.
He participated in the Vienna 1873 World Exposition.
He became mentally ill, and was unable to continue working.
He died in the mental hospital of Corfu.
The exact date is unknown.

Work

Zacharias produced a small number of portraits and genre scenes. 
They are both sensitive and technically strong.

Notes

Sources

1845 births
1873 deaths
Artists from Athens
Munich School
19th-century Greek painters